Karnysh is a rural locality (a village) in Krasnopolyanskoye Rural Settlement, Nikolsky District, Vologda Oblast, Russia. The population was 91 as of 2002.

Geography 
Karnysh is located 20 km west of Nikolsk (the district's administrative centre) by road. Molodyozhny is the nearest rural locality.

References 

Rural localities in Nikolsky District, Vologda Oblast